Yugavatara is a novel based on Shivaji's life story. The book is written by H. V. Sheshadri. This book got translated to Hindi and English.

References

20th-century Indian novels
Kannada novels
Biographical novels
Novels set in the 17th century
Year of work missing
Shivaji